Les Branchés à Saint-Tropez  (« The Fashioned in Saint- Tropez ») (1983) is a French B movie by Max Pécas.

It was a very big success when it came out in the theaters.

It is the first part of Max Pécas's "Saint-Tropez" trilogy, the two other movies being: Deux enfoirés à Saint-Tropez and On se calme et on boit frais à Saint-Tropez.

Cast
 Yves Thuillier
 Xavier Deluc
 Olivia Dutronc
 Marcel Gassouk as a policeman 
 Ticky Holgado as Ticky
 Andrée Damant as Madame Bardaut

External links
  IMDB page

1980s French-language films
French comedy films
1983 films
1980s French films